Greven is a railway station located in Greven, Germany. The station is located on the Münster–Rheine line. The train services are operated by Deutsche Bahn and the WestfalenBahn. The station is 10 minutes walk from the centre of Greven.

Train services
The following services currently call at Greven:
Rhein-Münsterland-Express Rheine - Münster - Hagen - Wuppertal - Cologne - Krefeld

Railway stations in North Rhine-Westphalia